A ministerial committee is a committee consisting of ministers of various  government portfolios.

A joint ministerial committee usually refers to committee consisting of ministers from different governments.

Australia
The term is used in both federal and state governments of Australia.

Examples
 Federal government
 Ministerial Committee Inquiry into The Portrayal of Violence in the Electronic Media, May 1996 – July 1996 
 Ministerial Committee to Oversight Implementation of Backing Australia's Ability (MCOIBAA) , later named "Science and Innovation Committee" but still referred to as a Ministerial committee 
 New South Wales
 Ministerial Committee of Inquiry into impotency treatment services 
 Northern Territory
 Ministerial Standing Committee on Crime Prevention 
 Western Australia
 Commercial Passenger Vessel Advisory Committee (CPVAC) 
 Ministerial Committee on Lesbian and Gay Law Reform

Joint ministerial committees
 Singapore–Australia Joint Ministerial Committee (SAJMC) 
 Australia–Japan Ministerial Committee (AJMC)

United Kingdom
An Interministerial Standing Committee exists in the UK as a committee of ministers and members of devolved administrations. It is not an executive body and cannot bind any of its participants.

References

See also
 Ministerial Committee on Foreign and Security Policy (Finland)
 Ministerial council

Politics of Australia
Politics of the United Kingdom